Juan Cáceres is the name of:

 Juan Cáceres (racing driver) (born 1984), Uruguayan racing driver
 Juan Cáceres (footballer, born 1949), Peruvian football goalkeeper
 Juan Cáceres (footballer, born 2002), Paraguayan football midfielder 
 Juan Francisco Cáceres (born 1962), Mexican politician
 Juan Carlos Cáceres (1936–2015), Argentinian musician
 Juan Daniel Cáceres (born 1973), Paraguayan football defender
 Juan Ignacio Cáceres (born 1992), Argentine sprint kayaker
 Juan José Cáceres (born 2000), Argentine football right-back